A sink school is a school that is noted for its underachievement.

Causes
The reported causes for the emergence of sink schools vary. It includes admission codes wherein some schools get a privileged access to the most gifted potential students, funding inadequacies, or unsuitable curriculum.

See also
Boarding school

References

School types
Ethically disputed educational practices